The Weekend Times was a weekly newspaper based in Malawi. It was published by Blantyre Newspapers Limited (BNL), which is owned by the family of the former dictator of Malawi, Kamuzu Banda.

Recent controversy

The paper published a front-page story implicating that the wife of the Zimbabwean president had been having a secret affair.

President Bingu of Malawi (using the National Archives of Malawi) banned the Weekend Times on 29 October 2010. He argued that it was being published illegally because it had not been properly registered. The ban was overruled by the Malawi High Court in Blantyre.

References

External links
The Weekend Times Official page

Newspapers published in Malawi
Publications established in 1993